Ole Werner (born 4 May 1988) is a German football coach who manages Bundesliga side Werder Bremen. He previously coached Holstein Kiel.

Career
On 17 August 2016, Werner became head coach of Holstein Kiel as interim manager. He managed two matches, first in the Schleswig-Holstein Cup quarter-final against ETSV Weiche which finished as a 2–0 win. He also managed a 3. Liga match against FSV Zwickau, which finished as a 3–0 win. On 27 August, he was replaced by Markus Anfang. On 16 September 2019, Werner returned as the interim manager for Kiel. On 24 October 2019, he was appointed as manager of Holstein Kiel. He resigned as coach of Holstein Kiel in September 2021 after four losses in seven games.

On 28 November 2021, Werner was named the new manager of Werder Bremen.

Managerial statistics

References

External links

1988 births
Living people
German football managers
Holstein Kiel managers
SV Werder Bremen managers
People from Preetz
Sportspeople from Schleswig-Holstein
3. Liga managers